Winteringham railway station was built by the North Lindsey Light Railway in Winteringham, Lincolnshire, England and opened for public service on 15 July 1907 although the first train, a village sports club special, had run two days previously.

Just north of the station the line divided in two; the "main line" ran to Whitton, and a "branch line" to a wharf at Winteringham Haven on the Humber where the company had installed two shutes for handling coal and slag. A weekly ferry service operated from the Haven to Hull, outward on Monday and returning on Wednesday.

The station closed to passengers on Monday 13 July 1925, though in all probability the last train ran on Saturday 11 July.  It remained open for goods traffic until 1 October 1951, with local farmers objecting strongly to its closure, citing particularly the station's use for onward transportation of their sugar beet to the Brigg sugar factory.

References

External links
local web site, with station trackplan and photos

Disused railway stations in the Borough of North Lincolnshire
Railway stations in Great Britain opened in 1907
Railway stations in Great Britain closed in 1925
Former Great Central Railway stations